The Hong Kong women's national basketball team is the women's national basketball team of Hong Kong. It is managed by the China Hong Kong Basketball Association (HKBA).

See also 
 Hong Kong women's national under-19 basketball team
 Hong Kong women's national under-17 basketball team
 Hong Kong women's national 3x3 team

External links
Official website
FIBA profile
Asia-basket.com - Hong Kong Women National Team
Archived records of Hong Kong team participations

References

Women's national basketball teams
Basketball in Hong Kong
Basketball teams in Hong Kong
Basketball